Bolshoye Maslennikovo is a village in Yaroslavl Oblast, Russia, located in the municipality of the Chebakovskoye rural settlement, Tutayevsky District. It lies about 20 km to the west from Yaroslavl. In 2010, the village was inhabited by 9 people.

Demographics

Population

Notable people 
Valentina Tereshkova, the first woman to fly in space during the Vostok 6 on 16 June 1963, was born there. The museum, Cosmos, devoted to Tereshkova and her flight, is located in the village of Nikulskoye, which is about 5 km to the south from Bolshoye Maslennikovo.

Notes

References

Rural localities in Yaroslavl Oblast
Tutayevsky District
Valentina Tereshkova